Munetoshi (written: 宗厳 or 宗俊) is a masculine Japanese given name. Notable people with the name include:

 (1604–1679), Japanese daimyō
 (1529–1606), Japanese samurai

Japanese masculine given names